The 2016 UST Growling Tigers men's basketball team represented University of Santo Tomas in the 79th season of the University Athletic Association of the Philippines. The men's basketball tournament for the school year 2016–17 began on September 4, 2016 and the host school for the season was also UST.

The Tigers finished eighth and last at the end of the double round-robin eliminations, winning three games against eleven losses. It was the most number of losses in a season for the Growling Tigers since the Final Four format began in 1993.

They had an average winning margin of 3.7 points and an average losing margin of 16.2 points. Three of their losses were by blowouts, once to the Adamson Falcons in the first round by 27 points, and twice to the De La Salle Green Archers by 38 and 43 points respectively.

Second-year guard Marvin Lee was chosen Player of the Week by the UAAP Press Corps in the second round of eliminations for the duration of October 12–16.

Roster

Depth chart

Roster changes

Subtractions

Additions

Coaching changes 
Boy Sablan replaced Bong dela Cruz as the Tigers' head coach following controversies surrounding the latter. Almost two months after falling short of winning the championship against the FEU Tamaraws in Season 78's Finals series, Dela Cruz became the subject of an administrative investigation stemming from complaints of physical and verbal abuse that he allegedly made against some of the players in the roster.

Short of calling it a preventive suspension, the Institute of Physical Education and Athletics (IPEA) has ordered the coach to recuse himself from team activities until a decision on his tenure was reached based on would-be findings from the investigations. As a result, Dela Cruz stopped attending team practices beginning January 25, 2016.

Rumors surfaced that former Growling Tiger Bal David was among those who were being considered to replace Dela Cruz, but eventually, it was Sablan who was selected to be the new coach in late May where he signed a one-year contract for the upcoming Season 79 basketball tournament.

Sablan was a Glowing Goldies teammate of former coach Pido Jarencio in the 1980s and also served as one of his deputies from 2006 until 2013.

Coaching staff 
Appointed as Sablan's deputies were Tylon Dar Juan, Bam Ledesma, Gina Francisco, Patrick Fran, Rabbi Tomacruz, John Aquino, and Kris Anthony Agarao.

Dar Juan was the coach of the Arellano Braves in the NCAA. He was also a member of the coaching staff of the Blackwater Elite team in the PBA alongside Sablan.
Ledesma was a member of the coaching staff of the Tigresses basketball team.
Francisco was UST's team captain of the women's basketball team in the 1980s and has been a long-time assistant coach of the men's basketball team.
Fran, a former Growling Tiger and PBA player, was as a member of the coaching staff at the Meralco Bolts in the PBA.
Tomacruz, who was also a former Glowing Goldie and PBA player also served as Jarencio's assistant coach.
Aquino has been the strength and conditioning coach of the Meralco Bolts in the PBA since 2010.
Agarao has been the strength and conditioning coach of the Growling Tigers since 2012.

Ineligibility issues 
Before the start of the season, the UAAP came out with a new ruling that would lower the age limit of student-athletes from the previously-accepted 25 years to 24 years. This would mean that two of the three graduating Growling Tigers would be considered over aged for the upcoming UAAP tournament. Team captain Louie Vigil, Fil-Canadian point guard Jon Sheriff and forward Kent Lao were on their final playing year in the Tigers roster, but only Vigil and Sheriff would be affected by the new rule. Sheriff turned 25 on July 31, while Vigil would be the same age on September 26.

Vigil was already considering signing up for the PBA rookie draft in October when the UAAP decided to defer implementation of the said rule. Protests lodged by concerned schools and affected athletes were instrumental in the reversion of the age eligibility rules. This was announced after the UAAP board of trustees convened in their annual planning session in Spain.

Injuries 
Mario Bonleon suffered a season-ending wrist injury during their September 14 game against La Salle in the first round of eliminations.

Schedule and results

Preseason tournaments

UAAP games 

Elimination games were played in a double round-robin format. All games were aired on ABS-CBN Sports and Action and Balls.

UAAP statistics 

|- bgcolor=#ffffdd
| Louie Vigil || 14 || 12 || style=|26.7 || 78 || 199 || 39.2% || 7 || 47 || 14.9% || 45 || 70 || 64.3% || 4.9 || style=|2.9 || 0.8 || 0.5 || 4.4 || style=|14.9
|-
| Jon Sheriff || 14 || 12 || 22.5 || 57 || 124 || style=|46.0% || 2 || 3 || style=|66.7% || 8 || 13 || 61.5% || 3.5 || 2.6 || style=|1.7 || 0.0 || 2.1 || 8.9
|- bgcolor=#ffffdd
| Jeepy Faundo || 13 || 3 || 19.7 || 25 || 64 || 39.1% || 0 || 0 || 0.0% || 22 || 42 || 52.4% || 8.2 || 0.4 || 0.3 || 0.5 || 1.2 || 8.1
|-
| Marvin Lee || 14 || 3 || 18.9 || 39 || 125 || 31.2% || 14 || 59 || 23.7% || 18 || 20 || 90.0% || 2.6 || 1.7 || 0.5 || 0.1 || 2.1 || 7.9
|- bgcolor=#ffffdd
| Renzo Subido || 14 || 2 || 16.3 || 29 || 93 || 31.2% || 8 || 38 || 21.1% || 28 || 41 || 68.3% || 1.6 || 1.4 || 0.6 || 0.0 || 2.4 || 6.7
|-
| Regie Boy Basibas || 12 || 3 || 13.6 || 23 || 72 || 31.9% || 1 || 14 || 7.1% || 16 || 26 || 61.5% || 4.2 || 0.9 || 0.2 || 0.2 || 1.9 || 5.3
|- bgcolor=#ffffdd
| Kent Lao || 14 || 8 || 20.2 || 21 || 83 || 25.3% || 8 || 37 || 21.6% || 22 || 32 || 68.8% || 3.2 || 0.2 || 0.2 || 0.1 || 1.7 || 5.1
|-
| Mario Bonleon || 3 || 0 || 8.3 || 6 || 15 || 40.0% || 2 || 4 || 50.0% || 0 || 0 || 0.0% || 0.7 || 0.3 || 0.0 || 0.0 || 1.0 || 4.7
|- bgcolor=#ffffdd
| Joco Macasaet || 14 || 3 || 12.2 || 18 || 42 || 42.9% || 0 || 0 || 0.0% || 10 || 15 || 66.7% || 3.1 || 0.2 || 0.1 || 0.2 || 0.9 || 3.3
|-
| Zach Huang || 14 || 7 || 9.9 || 11 || 28 || 39.3% || 0 || 1 || 0.0% || 15 || 26 || 57.7% || 2.2 || 0.6 || 0.1 || 0.2 || 1.3 || 2.6
|- bgcolor=#ffffdd
| William Afoakwah || 14 || 11 || 19.9 || 12 || 41 || 29.3% || 0 || 0 || 0.0% || 9 || 17 || 52.9% || style=|8.8 || 0.3 || 0.3 || style=|0.9 || 1.8 || 2.4
|-
| Oli de Guzman || 14 || 1 || 6.6 || 10 || 30 || 33.4% || 4 || 13 || 30.8% || 5 || 6 || 83.3% || 1.0 || 0.4 || 0.0 || 0.0 || 0.9 || 2.1
|- bgcolor=#ffffdd
| Justin Arana || 8 || 1 || 7.1 || 4 || 13 || 30.8% || 0 || 0 || 0.0% || 4 || 8 || 50.0% || 1.3 || 0.3 || 0.1 || 0.0 || 1.3 || 1.5
|-
| Enric Caunan || 8 || 1 || 6.4 || 4 || 10 || 40.0% || 0 || 0 || 0.0% || 2 || 2 || style=|100.0% || 1.5 || 0.1 || 0.0 || 0.1 || 0.6 || 1.3
|- bgcolor=#ffffdd
| Teshi Tateishi || 2 || 0 || 6.7 || 0 || 1 || 0.0% || 0 || 0 || 0.0% || 0 || 0 || 0.0% || 0.0 || 0.5 || 0.0 || 1.0 || 0.5 || 0.0
|-
| Jason Strait || 0 || 0 || 0.0 || 0 || 0 || 0.0% || 0 || 0 || 0.0% || 0 || 0 || 0.0% || 0.0 || 0.0 || 0.0 || 0.0 || 0.0 || 0.0
|- class=sortbottom
! Total || 14 ||  || 40.0 || 337 || 940 || 35.9% || 46 || 216 || 21.3% || 204 || 318 || 64.2% || 45.2 || 11.6 || 4.6 || 2.6 || 23.3 || 66.1
|- class=sortbottom
! Opponents || 14 ||  || 40.0 || 395 || 997 || 39.6% || 79 || 302 || 26.2% || 223 || 324 || 68.8% || 46.8 || 16.5 || 6.5 || 5.5 || 19.5 || 72.4
|}

Source: HumbleBola

Aftermath 
The future
Reeling from one of their worst finishes in the UAAP, the UST faithful were eagerly awaiting Steve Akomo's completion of his residency so that he can finally suit up for the Tigers and lead them back to their winning ways. The Cameroonian center has proven to be a reliable reinforcement when he led the University of the Visayas to the CESAFI Finals in 2012 against Ben Mbala who was then playing for Southwestern University.

During the Adamson–UST postgame interview at the MOA Arena last November 9, UST Coach Boy Sablan introduced Akomo to the press as the go-to guy for the Tigers alongside Joco Macasaet, Zach Huang and Regie Boy Basibas in their UAAP campaign for the next season. Macasaet, Huang, and Basibas, who were all in their second playing year, started the game for UST against the Falcons, while the veteran group of Louie Vigil, Kent Lao, Marvin Lee and Renzo Subido were benched, allegedly for disciplinary reasons. Sablan justified the action by saying that he was giving the fans a preview of the Tigers' future brand of basketball, in reference to the trio and Akomo.

The past
Former head coach Pido Jarencio, who gave the Tigers the 2006 UAAP title and a back-to-back Finals appearances in 2012 and 2013 had indirectly given the UST community a glimmer of hope when he sent out a controversial tweet from his social media account on December 6. The message reads, "I am just a call away," and a follow-up tweet had Jarencio exclaiming, "let's bring back the glory!"

Fans were quick to attribute his messages to the dismal performance of the team in the tournament, which was quite the opposite of their Finals run the previous year. Jarencio later confirmed in interviews that he was actually willing to come back to coach the team on two conditions, "if the position for head coach became vacant and if the management," and "if the UST community wanted him back." Jarencio resigned as UST's head coach in January 2014 in exchange for a coaching job in the PBA.

Departure of key players
On May 4, Renzo Subido announced on Twitter his plan to skip the upcoming Season 80 tournament. He explained how he was dissatisfied with the way that he has played during the course of his three-year college career. He also added that he planned to join the PBA D-League where he was hoping to improve his skills. A week later, Mario Bonleon made a similar tweet about taking time off from the team. On May 11, he had cited experiencing burnout as one of the reasons for wanting to leave the team. He also expressed his intention to join a D-League team during his time away from the Tigers.

Rumored dissatisfaction with the coach
The Growling Tigers joined the 2017 Filoil Flying V Preseason Premier Cup in the summer, but failed to make it past the elimination round compiling only a single win against seven losses. This was highlighted by a 39-point loss to the Lyceum Pirates. Because of the Tigers' poor showing, various reports began to circulate about some players' growing dissatisfaction with their head coach, which resulted to speculations that Sablan was on his way out as the team's chief tactician.

Sablan, whose one-year contract expired on May 31, 2017 denied rumors of his replacement, pointing out that there was not much time left for a new coach to prepare the team in time for the September 9 tournament opening. Dar Juan and incoming team captain Marvin Lee have also come out to Sablan's defense. Lee denied the report that some of his teammates wanted to leave the team by explaining that the players were given permission by the coaching staff to go on leave. He was referring to Regie Boy Basibas, Zach Huang, and Joco Macasaet who were all absent during the game against the San Beda Red Lions. Dar Juan, on the other hand told reporters that Sablan was not in physical shape to coach the team after going through surgery, but added that the head coach was actually present during the May 21 game against the Letran Knights. Sablan had undergone surgery on his gallbladder on May 15 and was unable to coach the team during the tournament. Assistant coaches Tylon Dar Juan and Bam Ledesma took over practices and coaching duties.

According to a tweet from former Varsitarian sports editor Alex Cerado on June 20, Sablan's contract has been renewed for another year.

Awards

Players drafted into the PBA

References 

2016–17 in Philippine college basketball
UST Growling Tigers basketball team seasons